"Criminology" is the second solo single by Wu-Tang Clan rapper Raekwon, from his debut album Only Built 4 Cuban Linx..., featuring Ghostface Killah, like many of the songs of the album. The song starts with dialogue from the film Scarface, where Alex Sosa insults Tony Montana through phone, calling him a "fucking little monkey", because he failed to blow up the activist's car, then the first verse is performed by Ghostface Killah, and the second by Raekwon, without a chorus. The B-side of the single is "Glaciers of Ice".

Ghostface Killah wrote his verse in San Francisco, and requested that RZA make a beat for the song.

The song was sampled later by Mos Def, for his song "Mathematics". Official radio

Track listing
"Criminology" (LP Version)
"Criminology" (Instrumental)
"Glaciers of Ice" (LP Version)
"Glaciers of Ice" (Instrumental)

Samples
"I Keep Asking You Questions" by Black Ivory
"Why Marry" by The Sweet Inspirations
Dialogue from the film Scarface

Chart positions

1995 singles
Song recordings produced by RZA
Mafioso rap songs
Songs written by Ghostface Killah
Songs written by Raekwon
Songs written by RZA
Raekwon songs
Ghostface Killah songs